Euthalia kardama is a butterfly of the family Nymphalidae (Limenitidinae). It is endemic to China. The species was first described by Frederic Moore in 1859.

References

kardama
Butterflies described in 1859